Nigel Akkara is an Indian actor who is noted for his character portrayal in Bengali movies. He acts in theatre as well.

Early life 
At the age of 21, Akkara was arrested with a charge of kidnapping and 17 other cases filed against him. During his days in the correctional home, he did post-graduation in Human Rights from Indian Institute of Human Rights, New Delhi. Later he became an actor and made his debut with the 2012 Bengali film Muktodhara.

Acting career 

Akkara made his acting debut in 2012 with Shiboprosad Mukherjee and Nandita Roy's Bengali movie Muktodhara. He shared the screen with Rituparna Sengupta. He played the character of a prisoner who changes himself into a positive person after getting in touch with a female dance drama coach while staying in jail. The film turned out to be a major hit at the box office and Akkara's performance as a newcomer was praised by both the viewers and the critics.

Filmography 

 Muktodhara (2012)
 Orissa, Malayalam feature film
 Onnyo na
 Yoddha: The Warrior (2014)
 Onnyo Apala (2015)
 Rajkahini (2015)
 Virus (2016)
 Asamapto (2017)
 Jingel Bell (2018, unreleased)
 Gotro (2019)
 Tirandaj Shabor

TV serial 
 E Amar Gurudakshina (2017)

Mahalaya

References 

Bengali male actors
Living people
1978 births
People from Kerala